Mishal Hamed Kanoo (born 25 February 1969), is an Emirati business magnate and currently serves as the Chairman of The Kanoo Group based in UAE and Oman. Kanoo was listed as one of the Top 100 Powerful Arabs 2017, Power 100, Rich List 2009, and The World's Richest Arabs.

Kanoo is the 4th generation to run the Kanoo family business. Established in Bahrain in 1890, The Kanoo Group's parent company, founded by Haji Yusuf bin Ahmed Kanoo, grew from its early trading and shipping enterprise into a diversified conglomerate across the Middle East. From Bahrain, the business spread to Saudi Arabia in the 1930s. In 1967, Kanoo's father, Hamed Kanoo came to the UAE to expand the family business. He successfully put up The Kanoo Group as a trade name in the country, which currently operates in UAE and Oman.

In 2015, Kanoo took over his role as the Chairman of The Kanoo Group after the death of Chairman Yusuf Ahmed Kanoo in 2014. Today, The Kanoo Group operates across a range of industries in shipping, travel, machinery, logistics, property, energy (oil, gas, electric, water), industrial chemicals, training, retail, and commercial activities, as well as other joint ventures.

Furthermore, Kanoo is a member of the Superbrands Council of the United Arab Emirates.

Early life and education
Born in Dubai and educated until high school locally, Kanoo continued his college studies in the United States. He took Comparative Theology and Philosophy and double major in economics as his first degree and later earned his MBA in Finance from the University of St. Thomas in Houston. He joined the family firm fresh out of university in 1991 as an Assistant Shipping Manager.

Kanoo left the business for a time to pursue higher learning and later earned his second MBA at the American University of Sharjah, where he subsequently became a visiting lecturer on a course in Family Business.

He worked at Arthur Andersen in Dubai as an auditor before returning to The Kanoo Group as the Deputy Chairman in 1997. At that time, his uncle, Mubarak Kanoo, was the chairman of the holding company.  He served as the Deputy Chairman until the time he took up his most recent role.

Career

Kanoo is a frequent speaker at conferences in the Middle East, and around the world at events where an independent Middle East view is required. Some of his speaking engagements include the World Summit on Innovation and Entrepreneurship in Dubai, and The International Herald Tribunes CEO Roundtable in Malaysia.

As visiting lecturer at the American University of Sharjah School of Business Administration, he is an advocate of education and believes that it allows people to take responsibility and control of their lives.

He was a columnist for MONEYworks Magazine, Arabian Business, Gulf Business and 7days, and continues to voice his views by regularly writing articles for local and regional media about social and business affairs in the Gulf and global capital markets, adeptly spelling out the ethical and religious values, blending them with modernity and progress.

Other businesses
Apart from the family business, Mishal is also a Professional and Motivational Speaker and holds chief positions as Chairman / Director of other companies including:
 Dubai Express LLC/ Freightworks 
 Johnson Arabia LLC 
 Wolffkran Arabia LLC 
 BRC Arabia LLC 
 AkzoNobel UAE Paints LLC 
 Gulf Capital Pvt. JSC 
 AXA Insurance (Gulf) (C) BSC 
 Green Crescent Insurance Company PJSC 
 Dalma Capital Management Limited 
 KAAF Investments 
 KHK & Partners Ltd

Philanthropy
Kanoo has been integrating corporate philanthropy in one of his missions to foster community-based sustainable developments in areas such as arts, education, health, social welfare, project management, sports, and the natural environment.

Interests

Meem Gallery
Kanoo is involved in the progress of Dubai's art scene. As an eccentric collector, a pride of place in his office goes to a painting of Cuban revolutionary Che Guevara by the Bahraini artist Jamal Abdul Raheem. He supported the creation of one of Middle East's fastest-growing art districts in Dubai, the Meem Gallery in 2007. He launched the Meem Gallery together with Sultan Sooud Al-Qassemi, a member of Sharjah's royal family and founder of Barjeel Art Foundation and British curator, Charles Pocock.

Meem Gallery's expertise lies in modern and contemporary Arab and Iranian art. In addition to exhibiting important modern and contemporary works, the Meem Gallery encourages a greater understanding of Middle Eastern art through its publications available at Noor Library. The Noor Library of Middle Eastern Art, held at Meem Gallery, is one of the largest international resource centres for the arts of the Middle East.

Collections
As an art connoisseur, Kanoo's hobbies include a collection of fine paintings, as well as Islamic art such as Spanish masters and calligraphy. He is also fascinated with exclusive pens and watches. In November 2014, Kanoo placed to spotlight more than 200 ‘Important Modern & Vintage Timepieces'  in Dubai to preview the highlights of the auction to be held in Geneva by hosting one of the world's premier watch exhibitions, Antiquorum (the first auction house to auction fine watches over the Internet in the 1990s).

Kanoo finds time to cultivate his love of books most especially about arts, literature and philosophy genres. He is also a motoring enthusiast.

References

External links 
 

Emirati businesspeople
1969 births
Living people